Martin County Courthouse is a historic courthouse in Shoals, Indiana. The courthouse was built in 1876 to replace the previous courthouse, which burned down in the same year. At the time of the courthouse's construction, Shoals had only been the county seat for seven years, and it was the ninth county seat in Martin County.

The new courthouse was built with local sandstone and red brick; its design incorporates elements of the Greek Revival and Italianate styles.

The new courthouse proved to be in a stable location, as the county seat has remained in Shoals since its construction. The courthouse served the county until 2002 and now houses the Martin County Historical Museum, which is operated by the Martin County Historical Society.

The courthouse was added to the National Register of Historic Places on June 17, 2005.

References

External links
 Martin County Historical Society

County courthouses in Indiana
Courthouses on the National Register of Historic Places in Indiana
Museums in Martin County, Indiana
Buildings and structures in Martin County, Indiana
National Register of Historic Places in Martin County, Indiana
1876 establishments in Indiana
Government buildings completed in 1876